O dia das calças roladas is a Capeverdean novel published in 1982 by Germano Almeida.

The book was first published on Ilhéu Editora.  The story is about an account of a strike that happened on the island of Santo Antão.

External links
 O dia das calcas roladas at Editorial Caminho 
O dia das calças roladas at livrodatero.blogspot.com 

Dia Das Calcas Roladas
Dia Das Calcas Roladas
Cape Verdean novels
Novels set in Cape Verde
Santo Antão, Cape Verde